Operation Kinetic was the name given to the deployment of 1,400 Canadian soldiers to Kosovo as part of the overall NATO effort in 1999 to stabilize the region.

References

History of Kosovo
Kinetic
1999 in Canada